The 1985 Penn State Nittany Lions football team represented the Pennsylvania State University in the 1985 NCAA Division I-A football season. The team was coached by Joe Paterno and played its home games in Beaver Stadium in University Park, Pennsylvania.

Schedule

Roster

Rankings

Game summaries

at Maryland

at Pittsburgh

vs. Oklahoma (Orange Bowl)

NFL Draft
Three Nittany Lions were drafted in the 1986 NFL Draft.

References

Penn State
Penn State Nittany Lions football seasons
Lambert-Meadowlands Trophy seasons
Penn State Nittany Lions football